The House of Hunyady de Kéthely is an Austro-Hungarian noble family whose members occupied important positions in the Empire. Their coat of arms was recognized in 1792 when the family received the title of Count in Hungary and in 1797 when they received the title of Imperial Count from Emperor Francis II. Although with the same name the family was not connected to Hunyadi family which ruled in Hungary in the 15th and the beginning of the 16th century.

Members
Ferenc Hunyady de Kéthely (d.  1690), count
László Hunyady de Kéthely (d. 1723), count
Franciscus Hunyady de Kéthely ( 1727), count
Joseph Hunyady von Kéthely ( 1808), count, chamberlain, obersthofmeister
Joseph Hunyady ( 1825–37), count
Ferenc Hunyady de Kéthely, count
László
Kálmán (1828–1901), count
Vilmos
Júlia (1831–1919), firstly Princess of Serbia, secondly Duchess of Arenberg

References

Sources

http://www.hunyady.hu/familyhistory.html

Royalty and nobility of Austria-Hungary